The Mouse Turned into a Maid is an ancient fable of Indian origin that travelled westwards to Europe during the Middle Ages and also exists in the Far East. The story is Aarne-Thompson type 2031C in his list of cumulative tales,  another example of which is The Husband of the Rat's Daughter. It concerns a search for a partner through a succession of more powerful forces, resolved only by choosing  an equal.

The fable’s classical analogue is Aesop's fable of "Venus and the Cat", in which a man appeals to the goddess Venus to change his cat into a woman. This fable has the themes of incomplete transformation and the impossibility of changing character. It has received many treatments in literature, folklore and the arts.

The Mouse-Maid Made Mouse
The story found in the Panchatantra relates how a mouse drops from the beak of a bird of prey into the hands of a holy man, who turns it into a girl and brings her up as his own. Eventually he seeks a powerful marriage for her but discovers at each application that there is one more powerful:  thus the cloud can cover the sun, the wind blows the clouds about but is resisted by the mountain; the mountain, however, is penetrated by mice. Since the girl feels the call of like to like in this case, she is changed back to her original form and goes to live with her husband in his hole. A variant of the tale appears among the Folk-Tales of Bengal under the name "The Origin of Opium". There, a holy man grants a mouse's successive wishes to become more than itself until it is changed into a woman fair enough to catch a king's eye. When she dies soon after in an accident, a mood-changing opium plant grows from her burial place.

The ancient Indian fable was eventually translated into Pahlavi and then into Arabic, but before a version of any of these works had reached Europe the fable appeared in Marie de France's Ysopet as a cautionary tale against social climbing through marrying above one's station. The creature involved is an ambitious field mouse who applies to the sun for the hand of his daughter. He is sent on to a cloud, the wind, a tower, and then the mouse that undermines it, to the humbling of his aspirations.

The theme of keeping to one's class reappears in a Romanian folk variant in which a rat sets out to pay God a visit. He applies to the sun and to clouds for directions, but neither will answer such a creature; then he asks the wind, which picks him up and flings him on an ant-heap - 'and there he found his level', the story concludes. A less harsh judgement is exhibited in Japanese and Korean variants where the father seeking a powerful match for his daughter is sent round the traditional characters of sun, cloud and wind, only to discover that he too has his place on the ladder of power. All these are animal fables that lack the transformation theme. In the Japanese case a rat is involved and in the Korean a mole.

The later version in La Fontaine's Fables, "The Mouse Metamorphosed into a Maid" (IX.7), acknowledges the story's Indian origin by making it a Brahmin who fosters the mouse and gives it back the body it had in a former birth. La Fontaine feigns shock at all this and finds at the story's culmination, in which the girl falls in love with the burrowing rat at the mere mention of its name, an argument to confound the Eastern fabulist's beliefs:
In all respects, compared and weigh'd,
The souls of men and souls of mice
Quite different are made -
Unlike in sort as well as size.
Each fits and fills its destined part
As Heaven doth well provide;
Nor witch, nor fiend, nor magic art,
Can set their laws aside.

The fable’s philosophical theme inspired the American poet Marianne Moore to a wry  and idiosyncratic recreation in her version of La Fontaine (1954):
We are what we were at birth, and each trait has remained
in conformity with earth's and with heaven's logic:
Be the devil's tool, resort to black magic,
None can diverge from the ends which Heaven foreordained.
This in turn was set for unaccompanied soprano by the British composer Alexander Goehr in 1993 (Opus 54). The fable was also the subject of Print 90 in Marc Chagall's set of 100 etchings of La Fontaine's work executed between 1927 and 1930.

Venus and the Cat
 
The Indian fable's western equivalent is the story of "Venus (or Aphrodite) and the Cat", which goes back to Classical times and is given the moral that nature is stronger than nurture. It figures as number 50 in the Perry Index and its many versions feature a cat turned into a woman by the goddess, who then tests her on the wedding night by introducing a mouse into the bedchamber. In the Greek version by Babrius, however, it is a weasel (γαλῆ) that falls in love with a man and begs Aphrodite to change her into a human, but then goes chasing after a mouse in the middle of the marriage feast. In ancient times it was speculated that the Greek proverb ‘a saffron (wedding) robe does not suit a weasel’ was connected with the fable and has much the same meaning that one’s underlying nature does not change with circumstances.

When the fable was related by Hieronymus Osius in a New Latin poem, nearly half of it was taken up by a consideration of basic unchangeability, the sense being echoed by internal rhyme and assonance: "Difficult to elicit, illicit,/ change where nature’s innate". During the troubled political situation at the time the edition of Aesop's fables illustrated by Francis Barlow was published, Aphra Behn gave a sly Royalist tilt to her summing up of the tale’s meaning: "Ill principles no mercy can reclaime,/ And once a Rebell still will be the same". In both these versions a young man besotted with his pet cat prays to the goddess to make the change so that they can marry.  The fable in the Barlow volume also has two different titles. On the illustration appears the English "The young man and his cat", while in the Latin explanatory text it reads De Cata in Fœminam mutate (The cat changed into a woman).

Jean de la Fontaine wrote a separate version of this fable, also under the title "The cat changed into a woman" (La chatte metamorphosée en femme, II.18), in which he gave the theme of change an extended, thoughtful treatment:
So great is stubborn nature's force.
In mockery of change, the old
Will keep their youthful bent.
When once the cloth has got its fold,
The smelling-pot its scent,
In vain your efforts and your care
To make them other than they are.
To work reform, do what you will,
Old habit will be habit still.

Though La Fontaine avoided mention of Venus as the intermediary for the change in his fable, she is there in Christopher Pitt's "The Fable of the Young Man and his Cat", which is turned into a satirical picture of womanhood. Except in the one important respect, the transformed cat accorded to the 18th-century social norm and
From a grave thinking Mouser, she was grown
The gayest Flirt that coach'd it round the Town.
Her reversion to cathood is interpreted by Pitt as a return to innate femininity; the foolish 
man is jilted by her, rather than she being punished by the goddess.

Artistic versions

La Fontaine's fable also received musical treatments which reinterpreted the basic story. Jacques Offenbach's one-act operetta La Chatte Metamorphosée en Femme (1858) verges on farce. A financially ruined reclusive bachelor is pursued by his female cousin. With the help of a Hindu fakir, she makes him believe that she is the reincarnation of the pet cat with which he is besotted. Its happy ending is reversed in Henri Sauguet's popular ballet La Chatte (1927). Here the goddess Aphrodite turns the woman back into a cat again after she leaves her lover to chase a mouse and he dies of disappointment. There had in fact been a much earlier ballet of La chatte metamorphosée en femme, with music by Alexandre Montfort and choreography by Jean Coralli. This was first performed in 1837 with the Austrian dancer Fanny Elssler in the lead role. Not only did the work inspire Offenbach to write his opera but it was also indirectly responsible for Frederick Ashton's late ballet of that name, created in 1985 for a gala in honour of Fanny Elssler in Vienna. Then in 1999 the French composer Isabelle Aboulker set La Fontaine's fable for piano and soprano as one of the four in her Femmes en fables.

Interpretations in the Fine Arts include Millet's chalk and pastel drawing of the fable (c.1858) in which a black cat with shining eyes enters and looks toward a startled man who pokes his head through the bed curtains (see opposite). This was followed by an Art Nouveau marble sculpture exhibited in 1908 by Ferdinand Faivre in which the woman seems more to be contemplating and stroking the mouse than hunting it. Later the subject featured as Plate 25 in Marc Chagall's etchings of La Fontaine's fables in which a figure with the head of a cat but the well-developed body of a woman looks out from the picture while leaning on a small table. Four centuries earlier Wenceslas Hollar had also pictured the transformation scene half way through in his illustration for John Ogilby’s The Fables of Aesop (1668).

Chagall's print, in its turn, inspired a poem by American poet Patricia Fargnoli. Published in her collection Small Songs of Pain (2003), it considers what the physical process of changing into a woman must have felt like. With its concentration on the woman's sexual characteristics, it takes us full circle to François Chauveau’s copper engraving in the first edition of La Fontaine's Fables (1668), which suggests that the hunt for the mouse takes place immediately following the act of love. This underlines the character of Aphrodite's test of the woman and explains the love-goddess' judgement in turning her back to her original form.

References

External links

Illustrations from books between the 16th – 20th centuries

Aesop's Fables
La Fontaine's Fables
Fictional mice and rats
Fiction about shapeshifting
Works about marriage
Indian folklore
Indian literature
Indian fairy tales
ATU 2000-2199

fr:La Souris métamorphosée en fille